Cristian David Lucchetti (born 26 June 1978) is an Argentine professional footballer who plays as a goalkeeper for Primera Nacional club Gimnasia Jujuy.

Career
Lucchetti started his professional career in 1995 playing for his hometown team Luján de Cuyo, who at the time played in Argentine regional tournaments. In 1996, he moved to Banfield and made his debut in the Primera División the same year. After two years in Banfield, he was transferred to Santos Laguna in Mexico where he played in the Mexican Primera División and in the 2004 Copa Libertadores.

In 2004, he returned to Argentina to play for Racing Club. In 2005, Lucchetti returned to his former club Banfield, where he became one of the club's goalscorers by taking penalties. In 2009, he was the first team goalkeeper of the first Banfield team ever to win an Argentine championship, keeping goal in every game of the Apertura 2009 championship.

On 11 June 2010, the 31-year-old goalkeeper left Banfield and joined on loan with a selling option to Boca Juniors.

In July 2011, he returns to Banfield for playing the 2011-2012 season, finishing last over 20 teams and being relegated to 2nd Division after 11 seasons and winning the Apertura 2009.

In July 2012, he moves to Atlético Tucumán.

Honours
Banfield
 Primera División: 2009 Apertura

Individual
 Ubaldo Fillol Award: 2009 Apertura

References

External links
 Argentine Primera División records and statistics(wikipedia article)
 Argentine Primera statistics at Fútbol XXI  
 
 
 Lucchetti, Cristian David at Historia de Boca.com 

1978 births
Living people
Sportspeople from Mendoza Province
Argentine footballers
Argentine expatriate footballers
Association football goalkeepers
Argentine people of Italian descent
Argentine Primera División players
Primera Nacional players
Liga MX players
Club Atlético Banfield footballers
Racing Club de Avellaneda footballers
Santos Laguna footballers
Boca Juniors footballers
Atlético Tucumán footballers
Gimnasia y Esgrima de Jujuy footballers
Argentine expatriate sportspeople in Mexico
Expatriate footballers in Mexico